UNESCO proclaimed 1979 as the International Year of the Child.  The proclamation was signed on January 1, 1979, by United Nations Secretary General Kurt Waldheim. A follow-up to the 1959 Declaration of the Rights of the Child, the proclamation was intended to draw attention to problems that affected children throughout the world, including malnutrition and lack of access to education. Many of these efforts resulted in the Convention on the Rights of the Child in 1989.

History
Numerous events took place within the UN and in member countries to mark the event, including the Music for UNICEF Concert, held at the UN General Assembly on January 9. WBZ-TV 4 in Boston, Massachusetts, along with the four other Group W stations, hosted and broadcast a celebratory festival, "Kidsfair" (usually held around Labor Day ever since) from Boston Common. A film festival showcasing international cartoon and film shorts focusing on children was held at the United Nations building in New York City on December 1, 1979.  Canadian animator/director Eugene Fedorenko created a film for the National Film Board of Canada, called Every Child, which centered on a nameless baby who nobody wants because they are too busy with their own concerns. This was used to explain how every child is entitled to a home. Sound effects were created with the voices of Les Mimes Electriques.

See also
Elizabeth Bodine
International observance
International Youth Year
Children's rights

References

External links
International Year of the Child at the United Nations Digital Library

Child, International Year of the
Childhood
1979 in the United Nations